Rongjiang County is a county in southeastern Guizhou province, China. It is under the administration of the Qiandongnan Miao and Dong Autonomous Prefecture.

Administration
Rongjiang County is divided into 9 towns and 4 townships and 6 Ethnic townships. Guzhou Town is the county seat which houses Rongjiang County Government and Rongjiang County Council.
Towns: Guzhou, Zhongcheng, Zhaihao, Pingyong, Leli, Langdong, Zaima, Pingjiang, Bakai
Townships: Congyi, Pingyang, Liangwang, Jihua
Ethnic Townships (all for the Sui people except Tashi): Renli, Sanjiang, Dingwei, Xinghua, Shuiwei, Tashi Yao and Sui

A 2019 video clip of three young girls in Rongjiang county's Jiatui village crying and begging their parents not to leave for their jobs in the city has received hundreds of thousands of views.

Transportation

Road
S308, S202, S222, S221

Expressway
G76
Yanhe–Rongjiang Expressway
Libo–Rongjiang Expressway

Railway
Guiyang–Guangzhou High-Speed Railway-Rongjiang Railway Station
Xingyi-Yongzhou Railway

Relative location

Climate

References

External links

County-level divisions of Guizhou
Counties of Qiandongnan Prefecture